Infirmary Building, Missouri State Hospital Number 3, also known as the Nevada State Hospital, is a historic hospital building located at Nevada, Vernon County, Missouri.  It was built in 1937, as a Public Works Administration (PWA) project.  It is an "X"-shaped Kirkbride Plan building and consists of a four-story central block with four three- and four-story wings.  The building is of reinforced concrete construction, faced in red brick, and is in the Modernist style.

It was listed on the National Register of Historic Places in 2005.

References

Works Progress Administration in Missouri
Hospital buildings on the National Register of Historic Places in Missouri
Modernist architecture in Missouri
Government buildings completed in 1937
Buildings and structures in Vernon County, Missouri
National Register of Historic Places in Vernon County, Missouri